The Bonnie & Clyde EP is an EP by the band The Afghan Whigs.

Track listing
 "Going To Town"
 "Creep"
 "If Only I Had A Heart"
 "You've Changed"
 "I Want To Go To Sleep"

References

External links
EP track listing on the Summer's Kiss website

The Afghan Whigs albums
1996 EPs